Horatio Walter Lonsdale (1844-1919) was an English painter and designer.

Life and works 
Lonsdale was born in Mexico in 1844.  After training as an architect, Lonsdale established a long partnership with the architect William Burges, working with him as his principal artist on many of Burges's major commissions, including Saint Fin Barre's Cathedral, Cardiff Castle, Castell Coch and the Yorkshire churches. Lonsdale worked so closely with Burges, particularly in the design of stained glass, that "it is often hard to say how much of any given design is Burges's and how much is (Lonsdale's) — designs were often initialled by both." He also designed the zodiac windows and celestial ceiling at Mount Stuart House and the silver casket in which the heart of Burges's great patron, John Crichton-Stuart, 3rd Marquess of Bute was transported to Jerusalem for burial in 1900. Burges's biographer, Joseph Mordaunt Crook, summed up Lonsdale's career; "a draughtsman of exceptional precision, his best work was all for Burges. Without the master's control, much of his later work tends to be mechanical and vapid.” 

An exhibition of Lonsdale's work, organised by the Yale Center for British Art, was held at Gallery Lingard in 1984. A collection of Lonsdale illustrations and cartoons, for the decoration of Mount Stuart House on the Isle of Bute where it is held, was catalogued in 2022. In the same year, an exhibition held at the house, Fantasy to Fabrication: 19th century design at Mount Stuart, included examples of Lonsdale's art. Lonsdale was a member of the Royal Academy.

Gallery

Footnotes

References

Sources 
 
 
 

1844 births
1919 deaths
English male painters
Royal Academicians
19th-century English painters
20th-century English painters
19th-century English male artists
20th-century English male artists
English designers
Artists' Rifles soldiers